William Andrew Sadler (February 28, 1909 – November 10, 1987), alternately spelled "Saddler", and nicknamed "Bubby", was an American Negro league shortstop between 1934 and 1944.

Early life and career
A native of Delaware City, Delaware, Sadler graduated from Howard High School. He broke in to the Negro leagues in 1934 with the Bacharach Giants as a power-hitting shortstop, and went on to play for the Brooklyn Eagles the following season.

Sadler died in Delaware City in 1987 at age 78, and was inducted into the Delaware Sports Museum and Hall of Fame in 1999.

References

Further reading
 Evening Journal staff (August 7, 1928). "Peerless Defeated by State Champs". The Wilmington Evening Journal. p. 36
 Evening Journal staff (May 20, 1929). "Green Dragons Drop Opener to Champs". The Wilmington Evening Journal. p. 16
 Morning News staff (April 6, 1934). "'Bub' Sadler Signed by Bacharach Giants". The Wilmington Morning News . p. 17
 Times Union staff (July 29, 1935). "Rookie Shortstop Stars as Eagles Take Two Games; Saddler Plugs Gap and Leads Attack Against Newark Colored Leaguers". Brooklyn Times Union. p. 13
 Daily Journal staff (August 8, 1936). "Strand Sidelights". p. 8
 Star staff (June 19, 1938). "Taylor On Hill Today; Pittsburgh Hurler Faces Black Senators at Ball Park". The Washington Star. p. 22
 Zabitka, Matt (April 29, 1982). "Blacks Bypassed for Sports Hall?". The Wilmington News Journal. p. 38
 Zabitka, Matt (November 12, 1987). "Obituaries : William 'Bubby' Sadler". The Wilmington News Journal. p. 24

External links
 and Baseball-Reference Black Baseball stats and Seamheads

1909 births
1987 deaths
African-American Methodists
Atlanta Black Crackers players
Bacharach Giants players
Brooklyn Eagles players
Washington Black Senators players
20th-century African-American sportspeople
Baseball infielders